The River Bend is a small region in western central Illinois and southern Illinois that comprises parts of Madison County and Jersey County.  The name comes from a section of the Mississippi River that flows roughly west to east instead of the usual north to south, causing a bend in the river.  The area is within the Metro East region, which is within the Greater St. Louis Metropolitan area.

The western boundary is dictated by the flow of the Mississippi river, beginning at the confluence of the Illinois and ending at the confluence of the Missouri. The eastern boundary stretches through a contiguous urbanized area revolving around the cities of Alton and Wood River.

List of communities within the River Bend

Cities

Villages

Census Designated Places

Unincorporated Communities

References

External links
Meeting of the Great Rivers
The River Bend Area Map

Regions of Illinois
Illinois River
Mississippi River